Kęstutis Kasparavičius (born June 2, 1954 in Aukštadvaris) is a Lithuanian author and book illustrator of over 60 children's books. His books have been translated into 26 different languages, including Chinese, Spanish, German, Portuguese, French, Italian, Russian, Polish, Ukrainian, Korean. Kasparavičius is known for his short feel-good stories about various comic characters. Bears, pigs, rabbits, and turtles find themselves trapped in puzzling and thought-provoking situations. Kasparavičius draws children's attention with detailed, colorful, and bright watercolor illustrations that are accompanied by humorous and witty stories.

Kasparavičius studied choir conducting at the National M. K. Čiurlionis School of Art (1962–1972). He transitioned from music to visual arts and worked on his degree in graphic design at the Vilnius Academy of Fine Arts (1972–1981).  He started as a graphic designer at a publishing house where his talent for illustrating was noticed. In 1984, Kasparavičius published his first book. He has four children and one grandson. He lives in Vilnius, Lithuania.

Latest books

2010: Mažoji žiema (The Little Winter)
2009: Baltasis Dramblys: Tolimų kraštų istorijos (The White Elephant)
2008: Kiškis Morkus Didysis (Rabbit Marcus the Great). Voted the best Lithuanian children's book in 2009.
2007: Sodininkas Florencijus (Florencius the Gardener). Voted the best Lithuanian children's book in 2008.
2007: Dingęs paveikslas (The Missing Picture) "In this mysterious and intriguing tale, a group of animals introduces children to the world of art through the analysis of a painting. The animals have gathered to celebrate the arrival of a work of art, but while they are gone, the painting is stolen. As they search for the culprit and attempt to recover the missing painting, the delightful tale unfolds, allowing young readers to investigate and form their own theories about art." - Barnes & Noble
2006: Braškių diena: paslaptingos istorijos (Strawberry Day: Mysterious Stories)
2006: Trumpos istorijos (The Short Stories)
2005: Kvailos istorijos (The Silly Stories)

Awards and nominations
 Golden Pen Award, Belgrade, 1990
 UNICEF award “Illustrator of the Year”, Bologna Children's Book Fair, 1994
 II Diploma “Premi International Catalonia d'Illustracio”, Barcelona, 1994
 Illustrations selected at The Society of Illustrators Children's Book Show, New York, 2002
 Award for Excellence, Bologna Children's Book Fair, 2003
 Nominated for the Astrid Lindgren Memorial Award, 2005 and 2006
 Diploma, Tallinn Illustrations Triennial, 2006
 Diploma for illustrations, Vilnius Book Fair, 2007
 Nominated for the Hans Christian Andersen Award, 2008 and 2010
Children Literature 'Atrapallibres' Award, Catalan Council for Children's and Young Adults' Books, Spain, 2010
Honored Illustrator, International Board on Books for Young People, IBBY Honor List 2012, 2012
He won the "Vittoria Samarelli Literary Award" (Castel Goffredo, Italy), 2014

References

External links
Kamanė - Interview with Kestutis Kasparavicius
Biographies of the Bologna Book Fair Participants: Kestutis Kasparavicius
Sample illustrations
Official Facebook Page
Barnes & Noble - Book Review
Lietuvos Rytas - K. Kasparavičius: gimęs piešti pasakas vaikams
Official Website - kestutiskasparavicius.com

Lithuanian children's book illustrators
Lithuanian children's writers
Lithuanian artists
1954 births
Living people
Vilnius Academy of Arts alumni
People from Trakai District Municipality
20th-century Lithuanian writers
21st-century Lithuanian writers